Francisco Rodrigues, nicknamed Tatu or Rodrigues Tatu  (27 June 1925 –  30 October 1988) was a Brazilian footballer.

He played for the following clubs: Ypiranga-SP, Fluminense, Palmeiras, Botafogo, Juventus, Paulista and Rosario Central (Argentina). He earned 21 caps (3 non-official) and scored 9 goals (4 non-official) for the Brazil national football team, and was part of the team at the 1950 FIFA World Cup and the 1954 FIFA World Cup.

References

External links

1925 births
1988 deaths
Brazilian footballers
Brazil international footballers
1950 FIFA World Cup players
1954 FIFA World Cup players
Fluminense FC players
Sociedade Esportiva Palmeiras players
Botafogo de Futebol e Regatas players
Clube Atlético Juventus players
Paulista Futebol Clube players
Rosario Central footballers
Expatriate footballers in Argentina
Association football forwards
Brazilian expatriate footballers